S&P Global Platts is a provider of energy and commodities information and a source of benchmark price assessments in the physical commodity markets.

Platts may also refer to:

People
 Bob Platts (1900–1975), English footballer
 Kenneth Platts (1946–1989), British composer
 Mark Platts (disambiguation)
 Robin Platts (born 1949), Canadian jockey
 Todd Russell Platts (born 1962), American politician
 Una Platts (1908–2005), New Zealand artist and art historian

See also
 Platt (disambiguation)
 Platte (disambiguation)